Graimbouville is a commune in the Seine-Maritime department in the Normandy region in northern France.

Geography
The A29 autoroute passes through the southern tip of the commune.

Population

Places of interest
 The church of St. Pierre & St.Paul, dating from the eleventh century.
 The motte of a 12th-century castle.
 The sixteenth century chateau de Goutimesnil.

See also
Communes of the Seine-Maritime department

References

Communes of Seine-Maritime